Medininagar, formerly Daltonganj, is a city municipal corporation in the Indian state of Jharkhand. It is the headquarters of Palamu division and Palamu district, as well as the subdivision and block of the same name. The city is situated on the banks of the North Koel River.

Origin of name
The city was named Daltonganj during the British Raj after Irishman Colonel Edward Tuite Dalton (1815–1880), an anthropologist and the commissioner of Chota Nagpur in 1861.  The name was changed to Medininagar in 2004 by the state government of Jharkhand, after Raja Medini Ray of the Chero dynasty. The former name is still retained in the name of the city's railway station.  It is administered by the Medininagar Municipal Corporation, which was formed on 30 May 2015.

Geography

The Betla National Park is located about 20 km from the city. This park is known for tigers, and comes under the Palamau Tiger Project. Another picnic spot nearby is Kechki, located about 18 km from Medininagar, at the confluence of the Koel River and the Auranga River. Netarhat, a plateau covered with thick forests, is also situated near Medininagar.

Transport

It has an airport in Chianki, used occasionally by visiting dignitaries.

Medininagar is well connected with Ranchi, Jamshedpur, Dhanbad, Raipur, Ambikapur, Kolkata, Durgapur, Varanasi, Delhi, Lucknow, Allahabad, Kota, Kanpur Gaya, Patna, and other locations by road.

Chianki Airstrip is located on the south of the Medininagar. It is mostly used by private choppers and small aircraft. There is a plan to strengthen and extend the airstrip for operation of medium size planes.

Demographics

 India census, Medininagar had a population of 389,307. Males constitute 53% of the population and females 47%. It has an average literacy rate of 87.29%, higher than the national average of 74.04%: male literacy is 91.92% and, female literacy is 82.10%. 13% of the population is under 6 years of age.

Culture

Major Hindu, Muslim, Sikh and Christian festivals are celebrated in Medininagar. The town is the seat of the Roman Catholic Diocese of Daltonganj.  The town has several societies, clubs, and NGOs including Palamau Club, Rotary Club and Rida Foundation.

Satyajit Ray's Bengali film, Aranyer Din Ratri was shot in Palamu and the upcoming Bollywood movie, Nastik starring Arjun Rampal was also shot in Medininagar.

Masoom art Group is an active NGO engaged in promotion of art and culture in the city.  Their motion picture Pratyavartan was focused on the issue of Naxal movement in the state.

Climate

Medininagar has a humid subtropical climate (Köppen climate classification Cwa).

Education

Nilamber-Pitamber University at Medininagar was established in 2009 and serves the Palamu division of Jharkhand.

There are many colleges for undergraduate, post graduate & other higher education in and around Medininagar which includes:
 Medinirai Medical College and Hospital
 DAV Institute of Engineering and Technology established by D.A.V College Managing Committee.
 Bhishma Narain Singh Law College
 Ganesh Lal Agrawal College
 Yodh Singh Namdhari Mahila Mahavidyalaya
 Janta Shivratri College
 Elite Public B.Ed. College
 Jyoti Prakash Mahila B.Ed. College

The major private schools in Medininagar include:
 M.K. DAV Public School, Chianki (CBSE)
 Sacred Heart School, Chianki (ICSE)
 Heritage International School (CBSE)

Medical Facilities
Town has a lot of Public as well as private medical facilities and attracts patients from neighbourhood Villages and Cities. The List Includes:

Public Hospitals:
 Medinirai Medical College & Hospital – Medininagar, Palamu

Private Hospitals:
 Prakash Chandra Jain Seva Sadan, Daltonganj
 Aashi Care Hospital
 Shree Narayan Multispeciality Hospital

Dental Clinics:
 Pragati Dental Clinic

Places of Interest

 Betla National Park, park hosts a wide variety of wildlife
 Palamu Tiger Reserve, one of the first tiger conservation projects in India.
 Palamu Fort, twin forts of Chero dynasty built by Raja Medini Ray.
 Hussainabad Fort, built by Mughal jagirdar, Hidayat Ali Khan.
 Shahpur Fort, built by Chero ruler
 Bishrampur Fort, built by Chero rulers
 Kala-Kabra mound, Harappan era artefacts
 Bhim Chulha, a 5,000-year-old stove, on which Bhima used to make food during the Pandavas’ ignorance

See also
 Ladigarh

References

 
Cities and towns in Palamu district
1880 establishments in India